Torata District is one of six districts of the province Mariscal Nieto in Moquegua Region, Peru.

Geography 
Some of the highest mountains of the district are listed below:

Mayors 
 2011-2014: Angel Manuel Hurtado Jiménez. 
 2007-2010: Higinio Zoilo Cabana Diaz.

Festivities 
 Candelaria Virgin

References

External links 
 INEI Peru